Krisztián Budovinszky (born 18 April 1976) is a Hungarian football player who currently plays for Páty.

References

External links
 
 Hungarian Championship stats at Futball-Adattár

1976 births
Living people
People from Mohács
Hungarian footballers
Association football defenders
Nemzeti Bajnokság I players
Veikkausliiga players
Mohácsi TE footballers
Budapesti VSC footballers
FC Hämeenlinna players
FC Haka players
Dorogi FC footballers
NK Slaven Belupo players
Demecser FC footballers
Budapest Honvéd FC players
Ferencvárosi TC footballers
First Vienna FC players
Lombard-Pápa TFC footballers
Shahrdari Tabriz players
Diósgyőri VTK players
Hungarian expatriate footballers
Expatriate footballers in Austria
Expatriate footballers in Finland
Expatriate footballers in Croatia
Expatriate footballers in Iran
Hungarian expatriate sportspeople in Austria
Hungarian expatriate sportspeople in Finland
Hungarian expatriate sportspeople in Croatia
Hungarian expatriate sportspeople in Iran
Association football midfielders
Sportspeople from Baranya County